Will Jordan (born Wilbur Rauch, July 27, 1927 – September 6, 2018) was an American character actor and stand-up comedian best known for his resemblance to, and impressions of, television host and newspaper columnist Ed Sullivan.

Early life
Born in the Bronx, Rauch grew up in Flushing, Queens.  His father was a pharmacist and his mother owned a hat store.  Jordan graduated from the American Academy of Dramatic Arts in Manhattan.

Career

As Ed Sullivan
In his act, Jordan came up with the catch-phrase, "Welcome to our Toast of the Town 'Shoooo'", which became a stereotypical joke for nearly every Sullivan impersonator after that, usually as the more generic "Really Big 'Shoooo'" (or "shoe").

Jordan appeared as Sullivan in the Broadway production of the musical Bye Bye Birdie in 1960–1961 (a role he would reprise in the revival from October 15, 2009, through January 24, 2010).

Most of Jordan's film and television performances since the 1970s have been as Sullivan in films that feature characters appearing on Sullivan's famous variety series.  These include:
I Wanna Hold Your Hand (1978), The Beatles
The Buddy Holly Story (1978), Buddy Holly and The Crickets
The Doors (1991), The Doors

In 1983, Jordan appeared as Sullivan in the 1960s-TV-style video for "Tell Her About It", the Billy Joel hit single.

Other work
Jordan's other impressions included Bing Crosby, Groucho Marx and Jack Benny. He imitated Peter Lorre and James Mason as one of the actors in "Psycho Drama" on Rupert Holmes's 1974 debut album Widescreen.

Jordan performed on the 1970 P.D.Q. Bach recording The Stoned Guest in the role of Milton Host, a send-up of Metropolitan Opera radio announcer Milton Cross.

He also participated in a recording project, called "The Sicknicks", with Sandy Baron. The pair produced a comedy single, "The Presidential Press Conference", which was a minor hit in 1961.

Personal life and death
Jordan had a son, Lonnie Saunders.

September 6, 2018, writer Mark Evanier announced Jordan died that morning at his Manhattan home at age 91.

Filmography

Television

Film

References

External links
 
 
 

1927 births
2018 deaths
American impressionists (entertainers)
American male film actors
American male stage actors
American male comedians
20th-century American male actors
21st-century American male actors
20th-century American comedians
21st-century American comedians
Deaths from cerebrovascular disease
People from the Bronx